The Primrose International Viola Competition (PIVC), also referred to as the Primrose Memorial Scholarship Competition (PMSC), is an international music competition for viola players sponsored by the American Viola Society and named for the 20th-century virtuoso William Primrose.

The 16th Primrose International Viola Competition was held December 12–19, 2021 in Los Angeles. The next competition is planned for June 2024.

History
International music competitions for instruments such as violin and piano had been held for decades.  However, there was a void in the music world to recognize the viola as a major solo instrument.  Because of a lack of substantial viola solo literature, the instrument's potential was not realized until the appearance of Lionel Tertis, considered the "father of viola playing".  William Primrose continued in Tertis' footsteps of excellence in viola performance, catapulting the instrument on to the international stage.  The Primrose International Viola Competition was created in 1979 as the first competition solely for the instrument.  In subsequent years other major viola competitions arose: the Lionel Tertis International Viola Competition, the now defunct Maurice Vieux International Viola Competition and, most recently, the Tokyo International Viola Competition.  

The Primrose International Viola Competition has been held regularly since 1986, often in conjunction with biennial meetings of the North American Viola Congress.  The competition currently makes its home in Los Angeles, California at the Colburn School.  Eligible participants are 29 years and younger of any nationality.  The competition involves three rounds during a week-long festival in which entrants perform a required work as well as several choices from a viola repertoire list that includes solo works, sonatas, concertos and transcriptions by Primrose.

PIVC / PMSC laureates

Required composition 
A compulsory work to be performed by all competitors has been selected for some competitions.

 2014 – Aldonza, Movement II from the Viola Concerto (2013) by Christian Colberg (b. 1968); Christian Colberg website
 2011 – Inner Voices for viola solo (2011) by Peter Askim (b. 1971); published by American Viola Society
 2008 – Recitative for viola solo (2007) by Scott Slapin (b. 1974); published by Liben Music Publishers
 1991 – Aria and Allegro for viola and string orchestra (1990) by Richard Lane (1933–2004)
 1989 – Concerto for Viola and Orchestra (1989) by Wayne Bohrnstedt (b. 1923)

See also
 List of classical music competitions 
 Lionel Tertis International Viola Competition
 Maurice Vieux International Viola Competition
 Carl Flesch International Violin Competition – also judged violists from 1970

References
 Primrose International Viola Competition
 American Viola Society

External links
 Primrose Competition official website
 2011 Primrose Competition video archive at Ustream

Music competitions in the United States
Violas